SHJ may refer to:

SHJ, the IATA code for Sharjah International Airport, United Arab Emirates
SHJ, the National Rail code for St Helens Junction railway station, Merseyside, England